Marion Heights is a borough in Northumberland County, Pennsylvania, United States. The population was 611 at the 2010 census.

Geography
Marion Heights is located at  (40.804745, -76.464013).

Government 
Marion Heights in governed by an elected borough council and mayor.  As of 2018, the mayor of Marion Heights is John Wargo.

Demographics

As of the census of 2000, there were 735 people, 314 households, and 212 families residing in the borough. The population density was 3,772.5 people per square mile (1,493.6/km2). There were 375 housing units at an average density of 1,924.7 per square mile (762.0/km2). The racial makeup of the borough was 99.32% White, 0.14% Native American, and 0.54% from two or more races. Hispanic or Latino of any race were 0.41% of the population.

There were 314 households, out of which 24.5% had children under the age of 18 living with them, 48.7% were married couples living together, 13.7% had a female householder with no husband present, and 32.2% were non-families. 29.9% of all households were made up of individuals, and 15.6% had someone living alone who was 65 years of age or older. The average household size was 2.34 and the average family size was 2.89.

In the borough the population was spread out, with 19.2% under the age of 18, 6.5% from 18 to 24, 26.9% from 25 to 44, 26.0% from 45 to 64, and 21.4% who were 65 years of age or older. The median age was 43 years. For every 100 females there were 92.4 males. For every 100 females age 18 and over, there were 88.6 males.

The median income for a household in the borough was $29,107, and the median income for a family was $37,500. Males had a median income of $31,029 versus $21,250 for females. The per capita income for the borough was $15,772. About 5.3% of families and 5.9% of the population were below the poverty line, including 2.7% of those under age 18 and 11.0% of those age 65 or over.

References

Populated places established in 1906
Boroughs in Northumberland County, Pennsylvania
1906 establishments in Pennsylvania